Lukas Schleimer (born 9 December 1999) is a German professional footballer who plays as a midfielder for 1. FC Nürnberg.

Career
Schleimer played youth football with Mosella Schweich before joining 1. FC Nürnberg's under-19 team in 2017. He made his debut for 1. FC Nürnberg II in 2018, before signing his first professional contract with the club in June 2020, lasting until summer 2022.

On 5 October 2020, he joined 1. FC Saarbrücken on a season-long loan. He made his debut for the club on 18 October 2020, coming on as a substitute, before assisting both of Saarbrücken's goals in a 2–1 victory over SpVgg Unterhaching in the 3. Liga. He made 13 appearances whilst on loan at Saarbrücken.

Schleimer made his debut for Nürnberg's first-team on 17 September 2021, and provided the assist for the club's only goal of a 1–0 win over Hansa Rostock.

References

1999 births
Living people
German footballers
Sportspeople from Trier
Footballers from Rhineland-Palatinate
Association football midfielders
1. FC Nürnberg players
1. FC Nürnberg II players
1. FC Saarbrücken players
Regionalliga players
3. Liga players
2. Bundesliga players